The Lower Rio Grande Valley Development Council (LRGVDC) is a voluntary association of cities, counties and special districts in the Rio Grande Valley region of southern Texas.

Based in Weslaco, the Lower Rio Grande Valley Development Council is a member of the Texas Association of Regional Councils.

LRGVDC operates regional transit services under the name Valley Metro.

Counties served
Cameron
Hidalgo
Willacy

Largest cities in the region
Brownsville
McAllen
Harlingen
Edinburg
Mission
Pharr
San Juan
Weslaco
San Benito

References

External links
Lower Rio Grande Valley Development Council - Official site.

Texas Association of Regional Councils